The 2019 Vanderbilt Commodores football team represented Vanderbilt University in the 2019 NCAA Division I FBS football season. The Commodores played their home games at Vanderbilt Stadium in Nashville, Tennessee, and competed in the Eastern Division of the Southeastern Conference (SEC). They were led by sixth-year head coach Derek Mason.

Previous season
The Commodores finished the 2018 season 6–7, 3–5 in SEC play to finish in sixth place in the Eastern Division. They went to the Texas Bowl and lost 38-45 to Baylor. On January 11, 2019, Vanderbilt offensive coordinator Andy Ludwig was hired to take the same position at Utah, leaving the position vacant. On January 31, 2019, Vanderbilt special teams coach Shawn Mennenga left to take the same position for the Green Bay Packers, leaving the position vacant. On February 8, 2019, Gerry Gdowski, Vanderbilt's quarterbacks coach, was promoted to fill the offensive coordinator vacancy.

Recruiting

Position key

Recruits

Preseason

SEC media poll
The 2019 SEC Media Days were held July 15–18 in Birmingham, Alabama. In the preseason media poll, Vanderbilt was projected to finish in last in the East Division.

Preseason All-SEC teams
The Commodores had three players selected to the preseason all-SEC teams.

Offense

2nd team

Ke'Shawn Vaughn – RB

Kalija Lipscomb – WR

Jared Pinkney – TE

Schedule

Schedule Source:

Game summaries

Week 1: vs. #3 Georgia

at Purdue

LSU

Northern Illinois

at Ole Miss

UNLV

Missouri

at South Carolina

at Florida

Kentucky

East Tennessee State

at Tennessee

Players drafted into the NFL

References

Vanderbilt
Vanderbilt Commodores football seasons
Vanderbilt Commodores football